The Waterbury Arts Magnet School is a public middle/high school located in downtown Waterbury, Connecticut. The school opened in 2004 alongside the newly renovated Palace Theater, to which the school is granted limited access for assemblies and performances. Prominent features of the school include various performance spaces, music labs, a television studio,.

References

Public high schools in Connecticut
Public middle schools in Connecticut
Schools in Waterbury, Connecticut
Magnet schools in Connecticut